Renée Rebecca Geyer (11 September 1953 – 17 January 2023) was an Australian singer who was long regarded as one of the finest exponents of jazz, soul and R&B idioms. 

Geyer had commercial success as a solo artist in Australia with "It's a Man's Man's World", "Heading in the Right Direction" and "Stares and Whispers" in the 1970s and "Say I Love You" in the 1980s. Geyer was also an internationally respected and sought-after backing vocalist, whose session credits include work with Sting, Chaka Khan, Toni Childs and Joe Cocker.

In 2000, Geyer's autobiography, Confessions of a Difficult Woman, co-written with music journalist Ed Nimmervoll, was published. In her candid book, she detailed her drug addictions, sex life and career in music. She described herself as "a white Hungarian Jew from Australia sounding like a 65-year-old black man from Alabama". She spent more than 10 years based in the United States but had little chart success there under her own name, yet contributing to releases by Neil Diamond, Men at Work, Sting, Trouble Funk and many others. Geyer returned to Australia in the mid-1990s and her career continued into the 21st century with her eleventh studio album Tenderland (2003), which peaked at No. 11 on the ARIA albums charts.

Rock historian Ian McFarlane described Geyer as having a "rich, soulful, passionate and husky vocal delivery". Geyer's iconic status in the Australian music industry was recognised when she was inducted into the ARIA Hall of Fame on 14 July 2005. Geyer and fellow 1970s singer Marcia Hines are the subjects of Australian academic Jon Stratton's 2008 cultural studies article "A Jew Singing Like a Black Woman in Australia: Race, Renée Geyer, and Marcia Hines".

Biography

1953–1973: Early years

Renée Geyer was born in 1953 in Melbourne, to a Hungarian-Jewish father, Edward Geyer, and a Slovak-Jewish mother, a Holocaust survivor, as the youngest of three children. Geyer was named Renée after another Holocaust survivor who had helped her mother in Auschwitz after Josef Mengele had assigned the rest of her mother's family to death. At a young age, the Geyers moved to Sydney where her parents were managers of a migrant hostel. Geyer described herself as a problem child, and her parents called her übermutig (German for "reckless"). She attended various schools and was expelled from a private school, Methodist Ladies College, for petty stealing. Her first job was as a receptionist for the Australian Law Society.

In 1970, at the age of 16, while she was still at Sydney Girls High School, Geyer began her singing career as a vocalist with jazz-blues band Dry Red. The group also contained Eric McCusker (later of Mondo Rock). For her audition she sang the Bee Gees' hit "To Love Somebody". She soon left Dry Red for other bands including the more accomplished jazz-rock group Sun. Sun consisted of Geyer, George Almanza (piano), Henry Correy (bass guitar), Gary Norwell (drums), Keith Shadwick (saxophone, flute, clarinet, vocals) and Chris Sonnenberg (guitar). The group released one album, Sun 1972 in August 1972, Geyer departed Sun in mid-1972 and joined Mother Earth whose R&B/soul music style was more in keeping with Geyer's idiom. Mother Earth consisted of Geyer, Jim Kelly (guitar), David Lindsay (bass guitar), John Proud (drums) and Mark Punch (guitar, vocals).

1973–1976: Renée Geyer, It's a Man's Man's World and Ready to Deal

In 1973, Geyer was signed to RCA Records, who had released Sun's album the year before, Geyer, already showing signs of her self-proclaimed "Difficult Woman" tag, loyally insisted that Mother Earth back her on the album. That lineup by then consisting of Mark Punch - electric and acoustic guitars,
Jim Kelly - electric and acoustic guitars, Harry Brus - bass guitar, Russell Dunlop - drums, George Almanza - piano and Bobby Gebbert - piano. Geyer's self-titled debut studio album was released in September 1973 which mostly consisted of R&B/Soul cover versions of overseas hits and was produced by Gus McNeil. Geyer left Mother Earth by the end of the year.

In August 1974, Geyer released her second studio album, It's a Man's Man's World, which was produced by Tweed Harris (ex-the Groove), It became her first charting album when it peaked at #28 in October on the Kent Music Report. The title track, "It's a Man's Man's Man's World", was a cover version of James Brown's hit from 1965 and became her first top 50 single.

Geyer then formed Sanctuary, to promote the album with the original line-up of, Billy Green (guitar; ex-Doug Parkinson in Focus), Barry Harvey (drums; ex-Chain), Mal Logan (keyboards; ex-Healing Force, Chain) and Barry Sullivan (bass guitar) ex-Chain). At the time Geyer had become disenchanted with RCA and their refusal to let her record more original material, she was prepared to wait out her contract if necessary. Former Chain members convinced Geyer to contact their label, Mushroom Records boss Michael Gudinski and band manager Ray Evans to strike a deal where they would record her and RCA would release the albums and singles with a Mushroom logo stamped on the label.

The arrangement led to Geyer's third studio album, Ready to Deal, which was recorded in August–September 1975, and by this stage Sanctuary line-up was, Logan, Sullivan, Mark Punch (guitar; ex-Mother Earth) and Greg Tell (drums). They co-wrote most of the material for the album with Geyer and Sanctuary was renamed as Renée Geyer Band; the album was released in November to reach #21. It spawned one of Geyer's signature songs "Heading in the Right Direction", written by guitarist Punch and Garry Paige (both ex-The Johnny Rocco Band), which reached the top 40 in 1976.

During this time, Geyer participated in the 1975 federal election campaign for the Liberal Party, singing their theme song "Turn on the Lights", the second most known Australian political song behind the 1972 Labor campaign theme song, "It's Time". In recent years, Geyer has distanced herself from the Liberal Party and politics in general, stating she had only done their theme song to earn enough money to record an album in the United States, where she had signed a contract with Polydor Records.

Before departing for the US, Mick Rogers (guitar; Manfred Mann's Earth Band) replaced Punch and Renée Geyer Band recorded a live album, Really Really Love You, at their farewell concert in Melbourne's Dallas Brooks Hall on 11 April 1976. Really Really Love You was released in August and reach the top 50; "Shaky Ground", the related single, appeared in September. Geyer relocated to the Los Angeles mid-1976.

1977–1979: USA, Moving Along, Winning and Blues License

In May 1977, Geyer released her fourth studio album Moving Along on RCA/Mushroom Records and peaked at #11 in Australia. It used Motown Records producer Frank Wilson, with the album's Polydor Records release for the US market titled Renée Geyer. Her backing musicians, Mal Logan (keyboards) and Barry Sullivan (bass guitar) were supplemented by members of Stevie Wonder's band, as well as Ray Parker Jr. and other US session musicians. It provided Geyer biggest Australian hit single, at the time, with "Stares and Whispers" peaking at #17. In the US, radio stations began playing several of the album's tracks, in particular a re-recorded version of "Heading in the Right Direction" which was issued as her first US & UK single.

Polydor were aware her vocal style led listeners to incorrectly assume she was black and urged her to keep a low profile until her popularity had grown, thus they suggested her US album release should not include her photograph. Known for her uncompromising and direct personal manner, Geyer refused to allow this deception and insisted on marketing the album complete with a cover photograph of what she referred to as "my big pink huge face". After the album's release, interest in Geyer subsided in the US, which Geyer later blamed on her headstrong decision regarding her marketing. Geyer earned respect in the US recording industry and for several years worked in Los Angeles as a session vocalist although she returned to Australia periodically. While in Australia in late 1977, Geyer released the single "Restless Years", the theme song for the Ten Network TV soapie The Restless Years, with its writer Mike Perjanik; "Restless Years" reached the top 40 in early 1978. Mushroom released the greatest hits Renée Geyer at Her Very Best in November 1977 which peaked at number 53.

In 1978, Geyer played the role of Christine on Walter Murphy's concept album Phantom of the Opera. In December 1978, Geyer released Winner. The backing band were Punch, Tell and Tim Partridge (bass guitar; Kevin Borich Express), together with session musicians. Geyer was unhappy with the mix and lack of support from Polydor, so she negotiated a release from her contract, brought the album tapes to Australia where it was remixed and released. Geyer herself, referred to the album as "a bit of a loser" as much of the material was not up to her usual standard. She toured Australia promoting it but neither the album nor its two singles achieved top 50 chart success.

Geyer's June 1979 release, Blues License, is unique in her catalogue as she combined with Australian guitarist Kevin Borich and his band Express to record an album of straight blues material. The added fire in her vocals was sparked by the harder edged backing from Kevin Borich Express, Logan, Punch, Tim Piper (guitar; ex-Chain, Blackfeather), and Kerrie Biddell (backing vocals; Brian Cadd band), it reached the top 50, became a favourite of fans and remained in print.

1980–1984: So Lucky, Renée Live and Faves

In 1981, Geyer recorded her seventh studio album So Lucky in Shangri-La Studios, Malibu, California. Helmed by Rob Fraboni (The Beach Boys, Bob Dylan, The Band) and Ricky Fataar (Beach Boys), the album moved Geyer from the soul style she had been identified with and added a tougher, rootsy rock/R&B style, while incorporating salsa and reggae. The lead single "Say I Love You" was released in May 1981 and became her biggest hit when it reached #5 on the Australian charts and #1 in New Zealand. So Lucky was released in November 1981 and spawned two further singles, "Do You Know What I Mean", released in December 1981 and reached the top 30 and "I Can Feel the Fire" released in February 1982. Geyer performed in Mushroom's 10th anniversary celebration, the Mushroom Evolution Concert on Australia Day (26 January) long week-end in 1982 at the Myer Music Bowl. The album was released internationally by Portrait Records as Renée Geyer by Renée Geyer and the Bump Band in 1982. In 1982, Mushroom subsequently re-issued her previous albums.

In 1983, Geyer released a second live album Renée Live in May, which included a duet with Glenn Shorrock (singer; Little River Band) on a cover version of Dusty Springfield's 1966 single "Goin' Back". In November 1983, Mushroom Records released a second greatest hits album, Faves, which concluded her contract. Geyer returned to the USA late in 1983 and concentrated on breaking into the musical scene in Los Angeles.

1985–1991: United States, Sing to Me, Renée Live at the Basement and Easy Pieces

Geyer visited Australia and performed three songs for the Oz for Africa concert (part of the global Live Aid program) in March 1985. It was broadcast in Australia (on both Seven Network and Nine Network) and on MTV in the US.

In 1985, Geyer signed with WEA Records and, in May 1985, she released "All My Love" which peaked at number 28. In June, her eighth studio album, Sing to Me, peaked at number 37. The album was not given a US release and none of the follow-up singles reached the top 50 and Geyer and WEA parted ways.

In May 1986, Geyer recorded Live at the Basement which was released later that year by ABC Records.

Geyer continued as an in-demand session vocalist, which she had also done in Australia. She was on Sting's 1987 double-album, ...Nothing Like the Sun, including the single "We'll Be Together". She performed a duet with Joe Cocker on his 1987 album Unchain My Heart and, following the album's release, toured Europe with him as a backing vocalist. She was audible on Toni Childs' hit "Don't Walk Away" from the 1988 album Union. Other sessions included working with Neil Diamond, Julio Iglesias, Buddy Guy and Bonnie Raitt. She also recorded "Is it Hot in Here" for the soundtrack of the 1988 film Mystic Pizza. She described her backing vocals as supplying "The old Alabama black man wailing on the end of a record so they hire the white Jewish girl from Australia to do it."

In 1988, Geyer joined Easy Pieces, with Hamish Stuart (guitar and vocals) and Steve Ferrone (drums) both ex-the Average White Band and Anthony Jackson (bass guitar). They signed to A&M Records and the band's self-titled album, Easy Pieces, was released in 1988 to positive reviews, but the label changed distributors just as it was released and music stores could not order copies. The album didn't chart.

1992–1999: Seven Deadly Sins, Difficult Woman, The Best of Renee Geyer and Sweet Life

Geyer visited Australia in 1992 and recorded a number of songs, including "Foggy Highway", for the ABC-TV mini series Seven Deadly Sins, alongside Vika Bull, Deborah Conway and Paul Kelly. The album was released in February 1993 and peaked at number 71 on the ARIA Charts. Two singles were released from the soundtrack including Geyer's cover of Willie Nelson's "Crazy".

Kelly produced Geyer's ninth studio album Difficult Woman which was released on Larrikin Records in 1994. It was her first solo studio album in 9 years. The exposure encouraged Geyer to move back to Australia and following the release of Difficult Woman, Geyer spent time reestablishing herself on the live circuit across Australia. These performances showed her more relaxed on stage than at her peak when her innate shyness was often cleverly disguised. Now a confident, mature woman she showed off a hitherto hidden wicked sense of humour.

In May 1998, Mushroom Records released The Best of Renee Geyer 1973-1998, which peaked at number 50 in New Zealand and 53 in Australia. The album was released with a bonus disc of remixed tracks including her 1981 single "Say I Love You" which was released as the lead single by GROOVE 21/20 featuring Geyer. Also in 1998, Geyer recorded "Yil Lull" alongside Kelly, Archie Roach, Christine Anu, Judith Durham, Kutcha Edwards and Tiddas.

In March 1999, Geyer released her tenth studio album Sweet Life. The album was again produced by Kelly and Joe Camilleri (Jo Jo Zep & The Falcons, The Black Sorrows). The album peaked at number 50 in the ARIA Charts.

2000–2008: ARIA Hall of Fame, Tenderland, Tonight and Dedicated

In 2000, Geyer released her autobiography, "Confessions of a Difficult Woman", after her 1994 studio album. In October 2000, Geyer performed at the Opening Ceremony of the 2000 Summer Paralympics in Sydney.

In August 2003 Geyer released her eleventh studio album Tenderland. The album peaked at #11 on the ARIA Charts, equalling her highest-charting album in her career.
Live at the Athenaeum was released in April 2004 and Geyer's twelfth studio album Tonight in April 2005.

On 14 July 2005, Geyer was inducted into the ARIA Hall of Fame by Michael Gudinski. At the ceremony, contemporary R&B singer Jade MacRae performed a Geyer medley, followed by Geyer singing her 1975 hit "It's a Man's Man's World".

In July 2007, Geyer was cast in the lead role in Sleeping Beauty. In 2008 she also provided a voice in the award-winning claymation Mary & Max by Adam Elliot.

Geyer and fellow 1970s singer, Marcia Hines, are the subjects of Australian academic, Jon Stratton's 2008 Cultural Studies article, "A Jew Singing Like a Black Woman in Australia: Race, Renée Geyer, and Marcia Hines". Geyer delivered a two-hour master class on 3 December 2008 to illustrate her annoyance of vocal gymnastics used by singers such as, Mariah Carey, Christina Aguilera and contestants on Australian Idol. Geyer was approached to be a judge on Australian Idol and The X Factor but declined, she criticised Hines for being "so neutral, I don't hear an opinion" and Kyle Sandilands for his comments that are hurtful. After having signed with Liberation Blue Records which teams her with former Mushroom boss, Gudinski, Geyer released the compilation, Renéesance in May 2009.

2009–2023: Renéessance, The Ultimate Collection and Swing

In May 2009, Geyer released Renéessance on the LIberation Blue label. The album is a collection of newly recorded acoustic versions of material Geyer had previously recorded. In June 2009, Geyer was diagnosed with breast cancer and following surgery was told that the cancer had been detected early and a full recovery was expected.

In March 2010, Warner Music Australia released another greatest hits compilation titled The Ultimate Collection. It became her highest-charting album in New Zealand peaking at number 21.

In August 2011 she was fined for careless driving over two incidents in Victoria in 2010 and 2011, where she crashed into parked cars, a tree and a shop front. Her lawyer had blamed the crashes on a drug she was taking to treat breast cancer which he said led to a loss of concentration. She was fined $500 that was ordered to be paid to the Cancer Council.

In April 2013, Geyer released her fifteenth studio album Swing, which is a big-band covers album. The album peaked at number 22 in Australia. Geyer toured the album across 2013. In November 2013, Geyer was inducted into the Music Victoria Hall of Fame.

In 2015, Geyer reportedly verbally attacked a receptionist at the Adina Hotel in Haymarket, leaving the receptionist in tears after telling Geyer that she needed to provide vehicle registration to access the car park. In January 2017, Geyer escaped conviction but was instead handed a 12-month good behaviour bond.

In October 2018, Geyer said that she wanted to record a new album, saying that "I am playing it by ear, but sometime in the next year, I would like to do something – another new album. I have collaborated with people on different things and other projects, but I would like to do something of my own again. And I think in the next twelve months it will happen. And it probably might be my last one. I will probably do something, like a tribute to a blues situation, because I have been so influenced by the blues through my life, and I have never really spoken to that. So, I might do something, that has to do with that. Some version of a blues record."

In January 2023, Geyer was admitted to hospital in Geelong where she had hip surgery. It was subsequently discovered that she had inoperable lung cancer. She died from surgical complications on 17 January 2023 at the age of 69.

Discography 

 Renée Geyer (1973)
 It's a Man's Man's World (1974)
 Ready to Deal (1975)
 Moving Along (1977)
 Winner (1978)
 Blues License (1979) 
 So Lucky (1981) 
 Sing to Me (1985) 
 Difficult Woman (1994)
 Sweet Life (1999)
 Tenderland (2003)
 Tonight (2005)
 Dedicated (2007) 
 Renéessance (2009) 
 Swing (2013)

Awards and nominations

Countdown Music and Video Awards
The Countdown Music and Video Awards were an annual award ceremony based on responses from viewers of Countdown between 1979 and 1986.
Geyer was nominated twice.

|-
| 1981 ||Renée Geyer|| Most Popular Female|| 
|-
| 1983 ||Renée Geyer|| Most Popular Female|| 
|-

ARIA Awards
The ARIA Music Awards are an annual awards ceremony which recognises excellence, innovation, and achievement across all genres of Australian music. They commenced in 1987. Geyer was nominated six times. In 2005, she was inducted into the ARIA Hall of Fame.

|-
| 1987 || Live at the Basement || Best Female Artist|| 
|-
| 1999 || Sweet Life || Best Adult Contemporary Album || 
|-
| 2003 || Tenderland || Best Female Artist|| 
|-
| 2003 || Tenderland || Best Adult Contemporary Album|| 
|-
| 2005 || Tonight || Best Adult Contemporary Album || 
|-
| 2005 || Renée Geyer || ARIA Hall of Fame || 
|-
| 2013 || Swing || Best Jazz Album || 
|-

Music Victoria Awards
The Music Victoria Awards are an annual awards night celebrating Victorian music. They commenced in 2005.

! 
|-
| 2013 ||Renée Geyer|| Hall of Fame ||  || 
|-

Australian Women in Music Awards
The Australian Women in Music Awards is an annual event that celebrates outstanding women in the Australian Music Industry who have made significant and lasting contributions in their chosen field. They commenced in 2018.

|-
| 2018
| Renée Geyer
| Lifetime Achievement Award
|

Bibliography

References

External links
 
 
 

1953 births
2023 deaths
ARIA Hall of Fame inductees
Musicians from Melbourne
Jewish Australian musicians
Australian people of Hungarian-Jewish descent
Australian people of Slovak-Jewish descent
Australian soul singers
Australian women pop singers
21st-century Australian women singers
20th-century Australian women singers